Soul Rebels is the second studio album by the Wailers, their first album to be released outside Jamaica. The Wailers approached producer Lee "Scratch" Perry in August 1970 to record an entire album, and the sessions took place at Randy's recording studio (also known as Studio 17) above Randy's Record Mart at 17 North Parade in Kingston, Jamaica, until November. First issued in the UK by Trojan Records in December 1970, the album has since been re-released several times on several different labels. Perry's production is sparse and haunting, only featuring guitar, bass, drums, electronic organs, and vocals with no horns or other embellishments.

Songs
The first track, "Soul Rebel", was from the first collaboration of Perry and Marley. Marley initiated the idea for the song, and Perry arranged and co-wrote the music as Marley dictated the lyrics.

Reception

Writing in Newsday in 1973, Robert Christgau found Soul Rebels superior to Marley and the Wailer's only American release at the time, Catch a Fire.
 
Allmusic gave Soul Rebels a glowing retrospective review, calling it "a strange and wonderful set of early reggae that at times plays fast and loose with the already established conventions of the genre".

Cover
According to the book, I & I: The Natural Mystics: Marley, Tosh and Wailer by Colin Grant, the band was not happy with the "soft porn" look of the album cover, clashing as it did with their sensibilities, and were upset that they weren't consulted on its look.

Track listing

Original album (1970)

The Definitive Remastered edition (2002)

JAD Remastered edition (2004)

Also "No Sympathy (Version)" (replaces "My Sympathy", due to error)

References

Bob Marley and the Wailers albums
1970 albums
Albums produced by Lee "Scratch" Perry
Trojan Records albums